Jacob Paul (born 6 February 1995) is a British hurdler who won the 400 metres hurdles event at the 2019 British Athletics Championships. He competed for England at the 2018 Commonwealth Games in Gold Coast, Australia.

Personal life
Paul is from Banstead, Surrey. He studied at the University of Bath, and graduated in 2016.

Career
In the 2010 season, he led the under-17 decathlon rankings, before choosing to switch to hurdling. He competed at the 2011 Commonwealth Youth Games on the Isle of Man, finishing fourth, and also the 2011 European Youth Summer Olympic Festival. at the 2013 European Athletics Junior Championships, Paul came third in the 400m hurdles event. He competed at the 2017 Summer Universiade, finishing third in his semi-final and missing out on the final by one place. In 2017, Paul came second in the British Championships, in a personal best time of 49.49, which was the first time he had run under 50 seconds. In the same year, he came fifth in the European U-23 Championships.

Paul received a late call up to the 2018 Commonwealth Games in Gold Coast, Australia after long jumper Greg Rutherford withdrew from the Games. The Games were Paul's first major senior championship. In 2019, Paul won the 400 metres hurdles event at the British Athletics Championships. In 2021, Paul won the 400 metres hurdles event at the National Athletics League, and came third in the event at the 2021 British Athletics Championships. He was not selected for the delayed 2020 Summer Olympics. At the 2022 European Athletics Championships, Paul was eliminated in the semi-finals of the 400 metres hurdles event, after finishing fifth in his semi-final. He set personal best times in both the heats and semi-finals.

References

External links
 

1995 births
Living people
People from Banstead
Athletes from London
British hurdlers
English hurdlers
Commonwealth Games competitors for England
Athletes (track and field) at the 2018 Commonwealth Games
British Athletics Championships winners
Alumni of the University of Bath